Anett György (born 7 October 1996) is a Hungarian racing driver currently competing in the TCR International Series and European Touring Car Cup. She previously competed in the Hungarian Lotus Cup amongst others.

Racing career
György began her career in 2013 in the Lotus Ladies Cup, taking several podiums and one pole position during her two seasons in the championship, she ended the seasons fifth and fourth in the championship standings those two years respectively. In 2015 she switched to the Hungarian Lotus Cup series, she finished the season tenth in the standings and she won the Ladies Cup class that year. She switched to the European Touring Car Cup for 2017, entering the series with Zengő Motorsport. Joining their three car lineup for the season, driving a SEAT León TCR alongside Norbert Nagy and Zsolt Szabó.

In June 2017 it was announced that she would race in the TCR International Series, driving a SEAT León TCR for her ETCC team Zengő Motorsport.

Racing record

Complete TCR International Series results
(key) (Races in bold indicate pole position) (Races in italics indicate fastest lap)

† Driver did not finish the race, but was classified as he completed over 90% of the race distance.
* Season still in progress.

References

External links
 

1996 births
Living people
TCR International Series drivers
European Touring Car Cup drivers
People from Esztergom
Hungarian racing drivers
Sportspeople from Komárom-Esztergom County
Zengő Motorsport drivers
Hungarian female racing drivers